Bisby Lodge is a bench in the Central New York Region of New York located in the Town of Webb in Herkimer County, east-southeast of Minnehaha.

References

Landforms of Herkimer County, New York
Landforms of New York (state)